Stanley is a neighborhood near the city centre of Alexandria.  The area is most famous for the iconic Stanley Bridge on the Corniche, as well as its private-access beach. The bridge has a total length of 400 meters with 6 spans.

See also 

 Neighborhoods in Alexandria

Neighbourhoods of Alexandria